Kelly Hayes may refer to:
 Kelly Hayes, Canadian politician (see New Democratic Party candidates, 2003 Ontario provincial election)
 Kelly Hayes, the former lead guitarist in the hard rock band Cold